Henry County is the name of ten counties in the United States of America:

 Henry County, Alabama 
 Henry County, Georgia
 Henry County, Illinois 
 Henry County, Indiana 
 Henry County, Iowa 
 Henry County, Kentucky 
 Henry County, Missouri 
 Henry County, Ohio 
 Henry County, Tennessee 
 Henry County, Virginia

All are named in honor of Patrick Henry, of Virginia, except Henry County, Iowa, which is named for General Henry Dodge.